Pete Yorn, also titled as PY, is the eponymous fifth album by American singer-songwriter Pete Yorn, released by Vagrant Records on September 28, 2010.

Reception
The album debuted at No. 66 on the Billboard 200 albums chart, with around 6,000 copies sold on its first week of release. It also debuted at No. 22 on the Billboard's Rock Albums chart, and No. 15 on the Alternative Albums charts. The album has sold 28,000 copies in the US as of January 2016.

Track listing
All songs written by Pete Yorn, except "Wheels", written by Chris Hillman and Gram Parsons.
"Precious Stone" – 3:26
"Rock Crowd" – 4:48
"Velcro Shoes" – 3:50
"Paradise Cove I" – 4:07
"Badman" – 3:13
"The Chase" – 4:04
"Sans Fear" – 4:17
"Always" – 3:27
"Stronger Than" – 3:39
"Future Life" – 4:11
"Wheels" – 3:18
Bonus track
"Favorite Song" – 2:40

Charts

References

2010 albums
Pete Yorn albums
Vagrant Records albums
Albums produced by Black Francis